Mangtanwala is a town of Nankana Sahib District in the Punjab province of Pakistan. It is located at 31°22'20N 73°50'40E with an altitude of 190 metres (626 feet).

This small town is the birthplace of Ganga Ram, commonly regarded as the "Father of Modern Lahore."

References

Populated places in Nankana Sahib District